Peter Barlow may refer to:

Peter Barlow (mathematician) (1776–1862), English writer on pure and applied mathematics
Peter W. Barlow (1809–1885), English civil engineer and son of the mathematician
Peter Barlow (Coronation Street), a fictional character in the UK television soap opera Coronation Street
Peter Barlow (footballer) (born 1950), former forward in the Football League
Peter Townsend Barlow (1857–1921), American jurist in New York City